Madisen Maguire (born 6 March 1996) is an Australian rules footballer who played for Geelong in the AFL Women's (AFLW).

AFLW career
In October 2019, Maguire was drafted by Geelong with pick #98. In June 2022, Maguire was delisted by Geelong.

References

External links

 

Living people
1996 births
Geelong Falcons players (NAB League Girls)
Geelong Football Club (AFLW) players
Australian rules footballers from Victoria (Australia)
Sportswomen from Victoria (Australia)